Dzmitry Shmatko (born 26 July 1989) is a retired Belarusian professional footballer.

External links
 Profile at Neman website
 

1989 births
Living people
Belarusian footballers
FC Dinamo Minsk players
FC Neman Grodno players
FC Partizan Minsk players
FC Minsk players
FC Gorodeya players
Association football midfielders